Namin County is in Ardabil province, Iran. The capital of the county is the city of Namin. At the 2006 census, the county's population was 59,242 in 13,682 households. The following census in 2011 counted 61,333 people in 17,085 households. At the 2016 census, the county's population was 60,659 in 17,836 households.

Administrative divisions

The population history of Namin County's administrative divisions over three consecutive censuses is shown in the following table. The latest census shows three districts, seven rural districts, and three cities.

References

 

Counties of Ardabil Province